The Investor is an English online business news service launched on June 14, 2016, in Seoul, South Korea.

Founded by Korean media and lifestyle company Herald Corporation, The Investor produces more than 100 articles daily, written by a team of Korean and international writers from South Korea's largest English daily The Korea Herald and its sister Korean publication 헤럴드경제.

One of the main features of The Investor is real-time regulatory filings offered for the first time in English in South Korea. Another one is a complete database of the 100 richest people in Korea that includes their personal information and net worth—including the value of their unlisted stocks and real estate. This list is scheduled to be expanded to 300 richest people by 2017.

The service also delivers English reports from research institutes, investment banks, and brokerages.

References

External links 
 Official website (mobile)
 The Investor's Facebook
 The Investor's Twitter

Business newsletters
Mass media in Seoul